Higashitaniguchi-ike is an earthfill dam located in Fukuoka Prefecture in Japan. The dam is used for irrigation. The catchment area of the dam is  km2. The dam impounds about 1  ha of land when full and can store 11 thousand cubic meters of water. The construction of the dam was completed in 1937.

References

Dams in Fukuoka Prefecture